JewBelong is a nonprofit organization that provides support for Jewish-identified people, as well as those curious about Jewish identity, religion, and culture. It is a tax-exempt corporation under Internal Revenue Code section 501(c)(3). It is registered since 2017 in Montclair, New Jersey, USA.

History 
JewBelong was founded by Archie Gottesman and Stacy Stuart.

Controversy 
JewBelong has gained notoriety for its "edgy" advertisements, particularly billboards.

In 2023, JewBelong funded billboard ads that said, "You don't have to go to law school to know that anti-Zionism is anti-Semitism." In Berkeley, CA, the billboards were subsequently altered to instead say things like, "Free Palestine" and "Jews4FreePalestine".

References

External links 

Montclair, New Jersey
Jewish organizations based in New Jersey
Non-profit organizations based in New Jersey